Idrisovo (İźris) is a rural locality (a village) in Arslanovsky Selsoviet, Kiginsky District, Bashkortostan, Russia. The population was 197 as of 2010. There are 2 streets.

Geography 
Idrisovo is located 31 km east of Verkhniye Kigi (the district's administrative centre) by road. Tuguzly is the nearest rural locality.

References 

Rural localities in Kiginsky District